Zebraplatys is a genus of jumping spiders that was first described by Marek Michał Żabka in 1992.

Species
 it contains five species, found in Taiwan, New South Wales, Western Australia, and South Australia:
Zebraplatys bulbus Peng, Tso & Li, 2002 – Taiwan
Zebraplatys fractivittata (Simon, 1909) (type) – Australia (Western Australia)
Zebraplatys harveyi Zabka, 1992 – Australia (South Australia to New South Wales)
Zebraplatys keyserlingi Zabka, 1992 – Australia (Western Australia)
Zebraplatys quinquecingulata (Simon, 1909) – Australia (Western Australia)

References

Salticidae
Salticidae genera
Spiders of Australia
Spiders of Taiwan